Casimir is a 1950 French comedy film directed by Richard Pottier and starring Fernandel,  Germaine Montero and Bernard La Jarrige. It was shot at the Neuilly Studios in Paris. The film's sets were designed by the art director  Paul-Louis Boutié.

Synopsis
Casimir is a vacuum cleaner salesman, who through a misunderstanding attracts the romantic attentions of a wealthy client Angelita. Eventually he arranges her pairing with Paul-André, while he secures a large order and is free to marry his own fiancée Denise.

Cast
 Fernandel as Casimir  
 Germaine Montero as Angelita Garcia y Gonzalez  
 Bernard La Jarrige as Paul-André - un peintre  
 Jacqueline Duc as Denise  
 Gaston Orbal as Poiret  
 André Numès Fils as L'huissier dela Société Prima  
 Cécile Didier as La gouvernante du docteur  
 Robert Seller as Dr. Labrousse  
 Lucien Hector as Le cafetier  
 Charles Fawcett as Mr. Brown, le PDG de Prima  
 Darling Légitimus as Caroline  
 Julien Maffre as Le cireur  
 Émile Riandreys as Le grippé  
 Alfred Arlais as Le pédicure  
 Edmond Méry as Le locataire nain  
 Pierre Ferval as Le névrosé dans la salle s'attente 
 Marc Arian as Collaborateur participant à la réunion de travail 
 Delcassan as La vieille locataire au sonotone

References

Bibliography 
 Jacques Lorcey. Fernandel. Éditions Ramsay, 1990.

External links 
 

1950 comedy films
French comedy films
1950 films
1950s French-language films
Films directed by Richard Pottier
French black-and-white films
1950s French films